Closest Thing to Heaven is the tenth studio album by the Filipino rock band Rivermaya. It contains ten tracks and was released under Warner Music Philippines in 2009. This is the final album with Jayson Fernandez and Japs Sergio, who left the band in 2011 and 2012, respectively. Rivermaya released three singles from the album: "Dangal", "Ambotsa", and "Remenis".

Track listing

Personnel
 Jayson Fernandez – lead vocals, guitar
 Japs Sergio – bass, backing vocals, lead vocals (track 10)
 Mike Elgar – guitar, backing vocals, keyboards
 Mark Escueta – drums, percussion, backing vocals, guitar, trumpet

Additional musicians:
 Amanda Ling – keyboards (track 2)
 Aldwin Perez – violin (track 9)
 Akemi Elgar – "I Know Right" and "Daddy, That's Enough" (track 7)
 Jolina Magdangal and Al – additional clappers (track 1)

Album credits
 Executive producer: – Jim Baluyut
 Associate producer – Neil Gregorio
 Studio coordinator – Liz Lorenzo
 All songs arranged by Rivermaya
 All songs recorded at Tracks Studios
 Engineered by Angee Rozul
 Assistant engineers – Monty Macalino, Liz Lorenzo, Rivermaya
 All songs mixed by Angee Rozul & Rivermaya
 Produced by Rivermaya & Angee Rozul
 Mastered by Angee Rozul

References

2009 albums
Rivermaya albums